The John Henry Carothers House, also known as Ezeal Carothers House, is a property in Franklin, Tennessee that was listed on the National Register of Historic Places in 1989.

It is a one-and-a-half-story stone farmhouse built by John Henry Carothers with help from his son, Ezeal Carothers, following a house plan that was purchased. It was built in 1937 out of limestone which the Carothers family quarried on the property.

The property was covered in a 1988 study of Williamson County historical resources.

References

Houses on the National Register of Historic Places in Tennessee
Houses in Franklin, Tennessee
Houses completed in 1937
National Register of Historic Places in Williamson County, Tennessee